Murtuza Ali Baig (8 November 1941 – 17 July 2015) was a first-class cricketer who played for Hyderabad and Oxford University between 1958 and 1971.

Career 
Baig made his first-class debut for Hyderabad in the Ranji Trophy in 1958-59 as a middle-order batsman. He played once in that season, and three times in 1959-60, but with little success.

After attending Osmania University in Hyderabad he went to New College, Oxford. Between 1961 and 1964 he played 28 times for Oxford University, scoring 1349 runs at an average of 27.53. His highest score was 103 against Derbyshire in 1962. He played three times in the annual match against Cambridge University; in 1962 his brother Abbas was also in the team, and they shared a partnership of 72 for the second wicket after Oxford had lost their first wicket to the first ball of the innings.

He returned to India and played irregularly for Hyderabad between 1965–66 and 1970-71. His highest score for Hyderabad was 83 (retired hurt) against Andhra in 1966-67.

He lived in Banjara Hills in Hyderabad with his wife Dilnaz. He died at home in July 2015.

References

External links
 
 Murtuza Ali Baig at CricketArchive

1941 births
2015 deaths
Indian cricketers
Oxford University cricketers
Hyderabad cricketers
Cricketers from Hyderabad, India
Osmania University alumni
Alumni of New College, Oxford